The Comox Valley is a region on the east coast of Vancouver Island, British Columbia, Canada, that includes the city of Courtenay, the town of Comox, the village of Cumberland, and the unincorporated settlements of Royston, Union Bay, Fanny Bay, Black Creek, and Merville. The communities of Denman Island and Hornby Island are also considered part of the Comox Valley. The Comox Valley contains the 47th largest metropolitan area in Canada with a population of about 76,000 as of 2022

Geography

The Comox Valley is a lowland area with deep alluvial soil. There are mountains to the west, and the Comox Glacier overlooks the valley, On the east, beaches stretch along the shore of the Strait of Georgia.

History
There were three groups of indigenous people, the Comox, the Pentlatch (who were then nearly extinct), and the Lekwiltok, in the valley. They farmed in the rich soil there, keeping the land cleared through burning.

According to researcher Samuel Bawlf, Sir Francis Drake visited this area in 1579. This assertion is written about in The Secret Voyage of Sir Francis Drake, 1577–1580 and suggests that Drake's reference to landing in what he called New Albion (the name of the region of North America explored by Drake) was, in fact, what is now known as Comox. This conclusion is not shared, however, by other historians such as Jules Verne and Samuel Johnson. According to the Canadian Encyclopedia, first contact in Comox between the original First Nations inhabitants and the first European visitors occurred in 1792 when HMS Discovery anchored in Comox Harbour.

The first European settlers arrived in the spring of 1861, intending to start farms.  At that time, Governor James Douglas was encouraging settlers arriving in the Colony of Vancouver Island to establish themselves in the Cowichan Valley and the Comox Valley rather than the gold fields of the mainland as these were the two areas that had agricultural potential on the island.  The first settlers were Nanaimo coal miners and Hudson's Bay Company employees, John and William Biggs, Thomas Dignan, Edwin Gough, Adam Grant Horne, Thomas Jones, Alexander McFarlane, George Mitchell, Thomas Williams, and Charles York all of whom had arrived on Vancouver Island before the 1858 gold rush. Of these, only Mitchell remained by 1862 when the Grappler arrived with the Comox Expedition. Dignan went to Gabriola Island. Horne and most of the others went to Nanaimo. A small pox epidemic in 1862 decimated the native population.

In 1862, Surveyor General Pemberton secured funding from the colonial government in Victoria to construct the first road into the Comox area from Nanaimo. Flooding and tree falls made maintenance of this road impossible. Until the mid-1890s, access to the area was only by sea. In 1874 the  government wharf and the first bridge over the Courtenay River were constructed.

The area became the centre of one of the British Empire's largest private railway concerns, the Comox Logging & Railway Company. It was also the headquarters of Comox Logging, which owned Block 29, a valuable stand of Douglas Fir timber, stretching from south of Courtenay well to the north of Campbell River. For a number of years, logging was the largest source of employment in the community. Logging and mining declined in the 1960s, and fishing later declined in the 1990s. At that time the region was one of the fastest growing in British Columbia, although the growth rate between 2001 and 2006 has averaged just 2.0% annually. Most workers in the logging industry commuted to camps and logging operations further north on the Island or the mainland Coast; the Field lumber mill in Courtenay was disassembled in the fall of 2006.

Economy
Since 2008, the area has been in the Comox Valley Regional District. The growth industries in the Comox Valley in recent years are tourism and construction. A ski resort at nearby Mount Washington brings in tourists. The Canadian Forces in the form of CFB Comox contributes to the local economy as well. The service sector accounts for over 50% of employment. The lumber resources of Comox Logging are now owned by TimberWest and are being cut for the second time. The remaining forest resources in Comox Valley are scattered amongst small woodlots on individual farms, or in isolated parks.

Transportation
Two main highways, several small airports, and a ferry terminal are the main transportation routes in and around the Comox Valley. The Southern Railway of Vancouver Island (formally known as the Esquimalt and Nanaimo Railway (E&N Railway)) operates a freight railway line with its northern terminus at Courtenay. Passenger service on the railway was suspended in 2011.

Highway 19A was the original highway 19 through the valley. For much of its route, it closely follows the shore and connects most of the communities. The current section of Highway 19 through the valley is farther inland than the "Old Highway 19" and is an express route and bypass through the populated areas.

The airports in the valley include CFB Comox, Courtenay Airpark, Courtenay Airpark Water Aerodrome, and Courtenay Airport. Air service is offered direct to Calgary and points south and east, as well as Edmonton and Vancouver. There is seasonal service to Puerto Vallarta in the winter and Toronto during the summer months.

The BC Ferries operates a terminal at Little River where it provides service to the Westview ferry terminal in Powell River and Blubber Bay on Texada Island.

Culture
In 2007 the area was designated one of Canada's "Cultural Capitals" by Canadian Heritage. A number of music and arts events are undertaken in the region. The community also has a number of volunteer and non-profit organizations devoted to cultural pursuits.

The Valley is known as "The Valley of Festivals". Events include the Art & Bloom Festival, North Island Hot Jazz Festival, Comox Valley Shellfish Festival, About Town!, Marina Park Main Event, CYMC Summer School & Festival, Vancouver Island MusicFest, Hornby Island Festival, Filberg Festival, Comox Nautical Days, Showcase Festival, Comox Valley Exhibition Fall Fair, and Cumberland Wild.

References

External links
 Comox Valley Regional District
 Comox Valley Chamber of Commerce
 Discover Comox Valley
 Comox Valley Guide

 
Mid Vancouver Island
Comox Valley Regional District
Valleys of British Columbia